Group G of the 2017 Africa Cup of Nations qualification tournament was one of the thirteen groups to decide the teams which qualified for the 2017 Africa Cup of Nations finals tournament.

The teams in the group played against each other home-and-away in a round-robin format, between June 2015 and September 2016. The group originally consisted of four teams: Nigeria, Egypt, Tanzania, and Chad. However, on 27 March 2016 it was announced that Chad had withdrawn from the competition on financial grounds. As per the competition's regulations, the matches involving Chad and played up to that point were annulled, and the scheduled forthcoming matches involving Chad were cancelled.

Egypt, the group winners, qualified for the 2017 Africa Cup of Nations. After Chad's withdrawal, the runners-up could no longer qualify as one of the two group runners-up with the best records, as any groups reduced to just three teams had only the group winner qualifying for the finals and were not considered when determining the best second-placed teams.

Standings

Matches

Goalscorers
As all results of Chad were annulled (points, scored and conceded goals), goalscorers in matches involving Chad are not counted.

3 goals

 Basem Morsy

1 goal

 Mohamed Salah
 Ramy Rabia
 Ramadan Sobhi
 Kelechi Iheanacho
 Oghenekaro Etebo

References

External links
Orange Africa Cup Of Nations Qualifiers 2017, CAFonline.com

Group G